Fábio da Silva Morais (born 22 April 1975 in Feira de Santana), commonly known as Fábio Baiano, is a Brazilian football player who plays for Brasiliense.

References

1975 births
Living people
Brazilian footballers
CR Flamengo footballers
Esporte Clube Juventude players
Esporte Clube Bahia players
Grêmio Foot-Ball Porto Alegrense players
Associação Desportiva São Caetano players
Sport Club Corinthians Paulista players
Santos FC players
Clube Atlético Mineiro players
CR Vasco da Gama players
Associação Atlética Ponte Preta players
Paysandu Sport Club players
Brasiliense Futebol Clube players
People from Feira de Santana
Association football midfielders
Sportspeople from Bahia